Texana is an unincorporated community in Cherokee County, in the U.S. state of North Carolina.

History
Texana was founded about 1850 by Texana “Texas” McClelland, and named for her.

References

Unincorporated communities in North Carolina
Unincorporated communities in Cherokee County, North Carolina